Algona Road is a major link road, connecting the residents of Blackmans Bay to Kingston in Southern Tasmania, Australia. The road was constructed in 1986 as a two lane road, with provision for a second carriageway when needed. A roundabout was installed on the junction with the Channel Highway in 1993 to address safety issues. The Kingston Bypass connects Algona Road to the Southern Outlet and provides a quicker route to the City of Hobart.

See also
 List of Highways in Hobart

References

Streets in Hobart